Anisolabella is a genus of earwigs in the subfamily Anisolabidinae. It was cited by Srivastava in Part 2 of the book Fauna of India.

Species
The genus includes the following species:

Anisolabella braueri
Anisolabella haasi
Anisolabella planata

References 

Arthropods of India
Anisolabididae
Dermaptera genera